Will Meugniot is an American writer, storyboard and comics artist, film producer and director. He is known for his work on animated shows in the 1980s, 1990s and 2000s.

Partial list of works 

 The Adventures of Corduroy (storyboard artist)
 Batman: The Animated Series (storyboard artist)
 Biker Mice from Mars (storyboard artist, 2006 version)
 Bionic Six (storyboard director)
 Bob the Builder (director, Ready, Steady, Build!)
 Bucky O'Hare and the Toad Wars (storyboard director)
 Captain America (unproduced due to Marvel's bankruptcy problems, replaced by Spy Dogs)
 Captain Planet and the Planeteers (storyboard artist, supervising producer, supervising director, for DIC Entertainment)
 Captain Power and the Soldiers of the Future (storyboard artist)
 Conan the Adventurer (producer)
 C.O.P.S. (storyboard artist)
 Defenders of the Earth (storyboard director)
 Denver the Last Dinosaur (storyboard artist)
 Diabolik (storyboard artist)
 The DNAgents (co-creator, artist)
 Exosquad (executive producer)
 Earthworm Jim (producer, storyboard artist; pitchfilm only)
 Galtar and the Golden Lance (story director, storyboard artist)
 Godzilla (story director)
 G.I. Joe: A Real American Hero (title designer, storyboard director)
 G.I. Joe: Valor vs. Venom (producer, storyboard artist)
 Jana of the Jungle (story director)
 Jem (producer, storyboard artist)
 Jonny's Golden Quest (storyboard artist)
 Jonny Quest vs. The Cyber Insects (storyboard director)
 Jurassic Park (storyboard artist, producer; pitchfilm for unproduced series)
 Little Shop (storyboard artist)
 Moon Dreamers (storyboard artist)
 NFL Rush Zone (storyboard artist)
 The New Adventures of Zorro (storyboard artist)
 Ozzy and Drix (storyboard artist)
 Pryde of the X-Men (producer)
 The Real Ghostbusters (director, producer when it was titled "Slimer and The Real Ghostbusters")
 Return of the Living Dead III (storyboard artist)
 Ring Raiders (director)
 RoboCop: The Animated Series (storyboard director, art director)
 Silver Surfer (storyboard supervisor)
 Street Fighter: The Animated Series (writer, animator, creative consultant)
 Spider-Man and His Amazing Friends (storyboard artist)
 Spider-Man Unlimited (producer, story of the first six episodes)
 Sport Billy (storyboard artist)
 The Secret Files of the Spy Dogs (writer of 2 & director of 12 episodes)
 Stargate Infinity (director)
 The Super Hero Squad Show (storyboard artist)
 Swamp Thing (storyboard artist)
 Teenage Mutant Ninja Turtles (storyboard artist, storyboard cleanup artist, 2003 version)
 The World's Greatest Super Friends (story director)
 X-Men (supervising producer, storyboard artist)
 X-Men: Evolution (storyboard artist)
 Dragonlance: Dragons of Autumn Twilight (director)
 Ultimate Avengers 2 (director)
 Dinosaur Island (director)

Partial bibliography
 1977, Superbitch No. 1 ASIN: B001GQN8YC 
 1992, Exotic Fantasy: The Sketchbooks of Will Meugniot ASIN: B0006P21IS
 2004, Dnagents: Born Orphans, 
 2006, Zombie Monkey Monster Jamboree, 
 2008, DNAgents Industrial Strength Edition,  
 2008 Pandora (as illustrator) 
 2010, The Boy Who Cried Wolf (as Illustrator)

Awards and nominations
 1991, Daytime Emmy nomination for 'Outstanding Animated Program' for Captain Planet and the Planeteers
 1991, Daytime Emmy nomination for 'Outstanding Animated Program' for The Real Ghostbusters
 1999, won International Monitor Award for 'Children's Programming – Director' for The Secret Files of the Spy Dogs

References

External links

Will Meugniot at the Lambiek Comiclopedia

Year of birth missing (living people)
Living people
American cartoonists
American comics artists
American comics writers
American film directors
American film producers
American male screenwriters
American storyboard artists
American television directors
American television producers
American television writers
American art directors
American male television writers